WCNY may refer to:

WCNY-FM, a radio station (91.3 FM) licensed to Syracuse, New York, United States
WCNY-TV, a television station (channel 20, virtual 24) licensed to Syracuse, New York, United States
WNYE (FM), an educational FM station located in New York City which, as an Apex band station, was assigned the call sign WCNY from 1938 to 1939
WWNY-TV, a television station (channel 7 analog/35 digital) licensed to Carthage, New York, United States, which was assigned the call sign WCNY from 1954 to 1965

Δ